The women's team pursuit competition in speed skating at the 2022 Winter Olympics was held on 12 February (semifinals) and 15 February (final), at the National Speed Skating Oval ("Ice Ribbon") in Beijing. Ivanie Blondin, Valérie Maltais, and Isabelle Weidemann, representing Canada, won the event, setting an Olympic record in Final A. This was the first gold medal for Canada in this event and the first Canadian medal since 2006. Ayano Sato, Miho Takagi, and Nana Takagi of Japan set an Olympic record in the semifinals and eventually won the silver medal. Japan was leading during the final against Canada when Nana Takagi fell down with less than half a lap to go. Antoinette de Jong, Marijke Groenewoud, Irene Schouten, and Ireen Wüst, representing the Netherlands, won the bronze medal.

Japan were the defending champion and the world record holder at the beginning of the Olympics. The Netherlands and the United States were the 2018 silver and bronze medalist, respectively; the U.S. did not qualify this year. The Netherlands are the 2021 World Single Distances champion in team pursuit, with Canada second and the Russian Skating Union third; however, Japan and the United States did not enter. Canada were leading the 2021–22 ISU Speed Skating World Cup after three events before the Olympics, ahead of Japan and the Netherlands.

Qualification

A total of 8 team quotas were available for the event, with a maximum of one team per NOC. The top six countries qualified through their performance at the 2021–22 ISU Speed Skating World Cup, while the last two countries qualified through their time performance.

Records
Prior to this competition, the existing world, Olympic and track records were as follows.

The following records were set during this competition.

Results

Quarterfinals
The quarterfinals were held on 12 February at 16:00.

Semifinals
The semifinals were held on 15 February at 14:30.

Finals
The finals were held on 15 February at 15:24.

References

Women's speed skating at the 2022 Winter Olympics